Nursing credentials and certifications are the various credentials and certifications that a person must have to practice nursing legally. Nurses' postnominal letters (abbreviations listed after the name) reflect their credentials—that is, their achievements in nursing education, licensure, certification, and fellowship. The letters usually appear in the following order:
 Highest earned academic degree in or related to nursing (e.g. "DNP" or "PhD")
 Nursing licensure (e.g. "RN," "LPN")
 Nursing certification (e.g. "CCRN")
 Nursing fellowship (e.g. "FAAN")

Generally, credentials are listed from most to least permanent. A degree, once earned, cannot, in normal circumstances, be taken away. State licensure is active until retirement and otherwise only revoked in cases of serious professional misconduct. Certifications generally must be periodically renewed by examination or the completion of a prescribed number of continuing education units (CEUs). This is often called maintenance of certification.

Nurses may also hold non-nursing credentials including academic degrees. These are usually omitted unless they are related to the nurse's job. For instance, those with master's degrees usually do not list their bachelor's degrees (only the highest earned degree), and a staff nurse would likely not list an MBA, but a nurse manager might choose to do so.

Some nurses who achieve a master's degree (MSN) leave the patient-care aspect of nursing, and practice in a more managerial role. An example would be earning an MSN in health-care risk management. Such a nurse, while still fully an accredited nurse, will likely become the risk manager for a hospital, working in health administration rather than direct care and perhaps even becoming the director or manager of the risk-management department. In this role, he or she may never see another patient except while doing hospital inspections, or perhaps talking to a patient or the patient's family about a quality-of-care concern. In this role, the nurse becomes something similar to an auditor and a teacher of patient care quality and risk for the entire hospital staff. This nurse likely will also get the certification CPHQ: Certified Professional in Healthcare Quality.

Nursing credentials are separated from the person's name (and from each other) with commas. Usually, no periods are  placed within the credentials (e.g. "BSN" not "B.S.N.")

Nursing certifications
In the United States and Canada, many nurses who choose a specialty become certified in that area, signifying that they possess expert knowledge. Over 200 nursing specialties and subspecialties are available.  Studies from the Institute of Medicine have demonstrated that specialty-certified nurses have higher rates of patient satisfaction and lower rates of work-related errors in patient care.

Registered nurses (RNs) are not required to be certified in a certain specialty by law. For example, it is not necessary to be a certified medical-surgical registered nurse (CMSRN) (the Academy of Medical-Surgical Nurses [AMSN] certification, administered by the Medical-Surgical Nursing Certification Board [MSNCB]) to work on a medical-surgical floor, and most medical-surgical nurses are not CMSRNs. Certifications do, however, instill professionalism and make the nurse more attractive to prospective and current employers. Certified nurses may earn a salary differential over their uncertified colleagues, but this is rare.

Some hospitals and other health-care facilities are willing to pay certified nurses extra when they work within their specialties. Also, some hospitals may require certain nurses, such as nursing supervisors or lead nurses, be certified. Certification instills confidence in the nurses. Magnet hospitals advocate certifications.

Alphabetical listing of nursing and related credentials and certifications

Key
Throughout the list, the following credentialing organizations are mentioned: 
 AACN: American Association of Critical-Care Nurses (http://www.aacn.org)
 AHNCC: American Holistic Nurses Credentialing Corporation (http://www.ahncc.org)
 ANCC: American Nurses Credentialing Center (https://www.nursingworld.org/ancc/)
 AANPBC: American Academy of Nurse Practitioners Certification Board (http://www.aanpcert.org)
 ONCC: Oncology Nursing Certification Corporation (http://www.oncc.org)

A
 AAS: Associate of Applied Science
 AAN: Associate of Arts in Nursing
 ABLS: Advanced Burn Life Support (not intended for postnominal use)
 ABQAURP: CHCQM - Board Certification in Health Care Quality and Management
 ACCNS-AG: Adult-Gerontology Acute Care Clinical Nurse Specialist (Certified by AACN)
 ACCNS-N: Neonatal Acute Care Clinical Nurse Specialist (Certified by AACN)
 ACCNS-P: Pediatric Acute Care Clinical Nurse Specialist (Certified by AACN)
 ACHPN: Advanced Certified Hospice and Palliative Nurse  
 ACHRN: Advanced Certified Hyperbaric Registered Nurse
 ACLS: Advanced Cardiac Life Support (not intended for postnominal use)
 ACM-RN: Accredited Case Manager-Registered Nurse
 ACNP-BC: Acute Care Nurse Practitioner-Board Certified
 ACNPC: Acute Care Nurse Practitioner Certification (Certified by AACN)
 ACNPC-AG: Adult-Gerontology Acute Care Nurse Practitioner Certification (Certified by AACN)
 ACNS-BC: Adult Clinical Nurse Specialist - Board Certified
 ACRN: AIDS Certified Registered Nurse
 ADLS: Advanced Disaster Life Support
 ADN: Associate Degree in Nursing
 AFN-BC:  Advanced Forensic Nursing–Board Certified (http://nursecredentialing.org/ForensicNursing-Advanced)
 AGACNP-BC: Adult-Gerontology Acute Care Nurse Practitioner-Board Certified (certified by ANCC)
 AGPCNP-BC: Adult-Gerontology Primary Care Nurse Practitioner-Board Certified (certified by ANCC)
 AGNP-C: Adult-Gerontology Primary Care Nurse Practitioner-Certified (certified by AANPBC)
 AHN-BC: Advanced Holistic Nurse-Board Certified (certified by AHNCC)
 ALNC: Advanced Legal Nurse Consultant
 ANEF: Academy of Nursing Education Fellow
 ANLC: Advanced Nurse Lactation Consultant
 ANP-BC: Adult Nurse Practitioner-Board Certified (certified by ANCC)
 ANP-C: Adult Nurse Practitioner-Certified (certified by AANPBC)
 ANVP: Advanced Neurovascular Practitioner
 AOCN: Advanced Oncology Certified Nurse
 AOCNP: Advanced Oncology Certified Nurse Practitioner
 AOCNS: Advanced Oncology Certified Clinical Nurse Specialist
 APHN-BC: Advanced Public Health Nurse-Board Certified (changed to PHNA-BC)
 APHN-BC: Advanced Practice Holistic Nurse-Board Certified (certified by AHNCC)
 APN: Advanced Practice Nurse
 APNP: Advanced Practice Nurse Prescriber
 APP: Advanced Practice Provider
 APRN: Advanced Practice Registered Nurse
 ARNP: Advanced Registered Nurse Practitioner
 ASN: Associate of Science in Nursing
 ATCN: Advanced Trauma Care for Nurses course

B
 BLS: Basic Life Support (not intended for postnominal use)
 BDLS: Basic Disaster Life Support
 BCEN: Board of Certification for Emergency Nursing (not intended for postnominal use)
 BM: Bachelor of Midwifery
 BMTCN: Blood and Marrow Transplant Certified Nurse
 BN: Bachelor of Nursing
 BNSc: Bachelor of Nursing Science
 BPS: Bachelor of Professional Studies with a concentration in Nursing
 BS: Bachelor of Science with Nursing Major
 BScN: Bachelor of Science in Nursing (Canada)
 BHSc Nsg: Bachelor of Health Science—Nursing Nursing Qualification for RNs in Australia
 BSN: Bachelor of Science in Nursing

C
 CANP: Certified Adult Nurse Practitioner
 CAPA: Certified Ambulatory Perianesthesia nurse
 CARN: Certified Addictions Registered Nurse
 CATN-I: Course in Advanced Trauma Nursing -Instructor (not intended for postnominal use)
 CATN-P: Course in Advanced Trauma Nursing -Provider (not intended for postnominal use)
 CBCN: Certified Breast Care Nurse
 CBN:  Certified Bariatric Nurse
 CCCI: Canadian Certified Clinical Instructor
 CCCN: Certified Continence Care Nurse
 CCDS: Certified Clinical Documentation Specialist
 CCE: Certified Childbirth Educator
 CCM: Certified Case Manager
 CCNS: Acute Care Clinical Nurse Specialist
 CCRN: Certification in Acute/Critical Care Nursing 
 CCTC: Certified Clinical Transplant Coordinator
 CCTN: Certified Clinical Transplant Nurse
 CDAL: Certified Director of Assisted Living
 CDDN: Certified Developmental Disabilities Nurse
 CDCES: Certified Diabetes Care and Education Specialist
 CDMS: Certified Disability Management Specialist
 CDN: Certified Dialysis Nurse
 CDONA/LTC: Certified Director of Nursing Administration/Long Term Care
 C-EFM: Certified in Electronic Fetal Monitoring
 CEN: Certified Emergency Nurse
 CENP: Certified Executive in Nursing Practice
 CETN: Certified Enterostomal Therapy Nurse
 CFCN: Certified Foot Care Nurse
 CFN: Certified Forensic Nurse
 CFNP: Certified Family Nurse Practitioner
 CFRN: Certified Flight Registered Nurse
 CGN: Certified Gastroenterology Nurse
 CGRN: Certified Gastroenterology Registered Nurse
 CHES: Certified Health Education Specialist
 CHN: Certified Hemodialysis Nurse
 CHPLN: Certified Hospice and Palliative Licensed Nurse 
 CHPN: Certified Hospice and Palliative Nurse 
 CHPNA: Certified Hospice and Palliative Nursing Assistant 
 CHPPN: Certified Hospice and Palliative Pediatric Nurse 
 CHRN: Certified Hyperbaric Registered Nurse
 CHSE: Certified Healthcare Simulation Educator
 CHSE-A: Certified Healthcare Simulation Educator-Advanced
 CHSOS: Certified Healthcare Simulation Operations Specialist
 CIC: Certified in Infection Control
 CLC: Certified Lactation Counselor
 CLNC: Certified Legal Nurse Consultant
 CLS: Clinical Laboratory Scientist
 CM: Certified Midwife
 CMA: Certified Medical Assistant
 CMAS: Certified Medical Audit Specialist
 CMC: Cardiac Medicine Certification
 CMCN: Certified Managed Care Nurse
 CMDSC: Certified MDS Coordinator
 CMSRN: Certified Medical—Surgical Registered Nurse
 CNA: Certified Nursing Assistant
 CNCC(C): Certified Nurse in Critical Care (Canada)
 CNE: Certified Nursing Educator
 CNE: Chief Nurse Executive
 CNeph(C): Certified in Nephrology Nursing (Canada)
 CNL: Clinical Nurse Leader
 CNLCP: Certified Nurse Life Care Planner
 CNM: Certified Nurse Midwife
 CNML: Certified Nurse Manager and Leader
 CNN: Certified in Nephrology Nursing
 CNO: Chief Nursing Officer
 CNOR: Certified Perioperative Nurse
 CNP: Certified Nurse Practitioner
 C-NPT: Certified in Neonatal Pediatric Transport
 CNRN: Certified Neuroscience Registered Nurse
 CNS: Clinical Nurse Specialist
 CNSC: Certified Nutrition Support Clinician (Formerly CNSN: Certified Nutrition Support Nurse)
 COCN: Certified Ostomy Care Nurse
 COHC: Certified Occupational Hearing Conservationist
 COHN: Certified Occupational Health Nurse
 COHN/CM: Certified Occupational Health Nurse/Case Manager
 COHN-S: Certified Occupational Health Nurse—Specialist
 COHN-S/CM: Certified Occupational Health Nurse—Specialist/Case Manager
 CORLN: Certified Otorhinolaryngology Nurse
 CPAN: Certified Post Anesthesia Nurse
 CPDN: Certified Peritoneal Dialysis Nurse
 CPEN: Certified Pediatric Emergency Nurse
 CPHON: Certified Pediatric Hematology Oncology Nurse
 CPHQ: Certified Professional in Healthcare Quality
 CPLC: Certified in Perinatal Loss Care 
 CPN: Certified Pediatric Nurse or Community Psychiatric Nurse (United Kingdom)
 CPNA: Certified Pediatric Nurse Associate
 CPNL: Certified Practical Nurse, Long-term care
 CPNP: Certified Pediatric Nurse Practitioner
 CPON: Certified Pediatric Oncology Nurse
 CPSN: Certified Plastic Surgical Nurse
 CRN: Certified Radiologic Nurse
 CRNA: Certified Registered Nurse Anesthetist
 CRNFA: Certified Registered Nurse First Assistant
 CRNI: Certified Registered Nurse Infusion
 CRNL: Certified Registered Nurse, Long-term care
 CRNO: Certified Registered Nurse in Ophthalmology
 CRNP: Certified Registered Nurse Practitioner
 CRRN: Certified Rehabilitation Registered Nurse
 CRRN-A: Certified Rehabilitation Registered Nurse—Advanced
 CS: Clinical Specialist
 CSC: Cardiac Surgery Certification
 CSHA: Certified Specialist in Hospital Accreditation
 CSN: Certified School Nurse
 C-SPI: Certified Specialist in Poison Information
 CT: Certified in Thanatology (dying, death and bereavement)
 CTN: Certified Transcultural Nurse
 CTRN: Certified Transport Registered Nurse
 CTRS: Certified Therapeutic Recreational Specialist
 CUA: Certified Urologic Associate
 CUCNS: Certified Urologic Clinical Nurse Specialist
 CUNP: Certified Urologic Nurse Practitioner
 CURN: Certified Urologic Registered Nurse
 CVICU: Cardiovascular Intensive Care Unit
 CVN: Certified Vascular Nurse
 CVOR: Cardiovascular Operating Room
 CVRN-BC:  Cardiovascular Nurse-Board Certified.
 CWCN: Certified Wound Care Nurse
 CWOCN: Certified Wound, Ostomy, Continence Nurse
 CWS: Certified Wound Specialist

D
 DCNP: Dermatology Certified Nurse Practitioner
 DipNAdmin: Diploma in Nursing Administration
 DN: Doctor of Nursing
 DNP: Doctor of Nursing Practice
 DrNP: Doctor of Nursing Practice
 DNS: Doctor of Nursing Science  also seen as DNSc
 DSN: Diabetes Specialist Nurse
 DWC: Diabetic Wound Certified
 DVNE: Domestic violence nurse examiner

E
 ECRN: Emergency Communications Registered Nurse (not intended for postnominal use)
 ED: Emergency Department
 EdD: Doctor of Education
 EN: Enrolled Nurse
 ENC(C): Emergency Nurse Certified (Canada)
 ENP-BC: Emergency Nurse Practitioner-Board Certified (certified by ANCC)
 ENP-C: Emergency Nurse Practitioner- Certified (certified by AANPBC)
 ENPC: Emergency Nursing Pediatric Course (not intended for postnominal use)
 ENPC-I: Emergency Nursing Pediatric Course Instructor (not intended for postnominal use)
 ENPC-P: Emergency Nursing Pediatric Course Provider (not intended for postnominal use)
 ET: Enterostomal Therapist

F
 FAADN: Fellow, Academy of Associate Degree Nursing 
 FAAN: Fellow, American Academy of Nursing
 FAANA: Fellow, American Association of Nurse Anesthesiology
 FAANP: Fellow, American Association of Nurse Practitioners
 FAAOHN: Fellow, American Association of Occupational Health Nurses 
 FAAPM: Fellow, American Academy of Pain Management
 FACCWS: Fellow, American College of Certified Wound Specialists
 FACHE: Fellow, American College of Healthcare Executives
 FAEN: Fellow, Academy of Emergency Nursing
 FAHA: Fellow, American Heart Association
 FNC: Family Nurse Clinician
 FNP-C: Family Nurse Practitioner - Certified (Certified by AANPBC)
 FNP-BC: Family Nurse Practitioner - Board Certified (Certified by ANCC)
 FPNP: Family Planning Nurse Practitioner
 FRCN: Fellow, Royal College of Nursing
 FRCNA: Fellow, Royal College of Nursing, Australia
 FT: Fellow in Thanatology, Association of Death Educators and Counselors

G
 GN: Graduate Nurse (awaiting RN licensure)
 GNP: Gerontological Nurse Practitioner
 GPN: General Pediatric Nurse
 GPN: Graduate Practical Nurse
 GRN: Graduate Registered Nurse

H
 HACP: Hospital Accreditation Certified Professional
 HNB-BC: Holistic Nurse Baccalaureate-Board Certified (certified by AHNCC)
 HNC: Holistic Nurse, Certified (changed to HN-BC)
 HN-BC: Holistic Nurse-Board Certified (certified by AHNCC)
 HWNC-BC: Health and Wellness Nurse Coach-Board Certified (certified by AHNCC)

I
 IBQH:  International Board for Quality in Healthcare
 IBCLC: International Board-Certified Lactation Consultant
 ICC: Intensive Care Certification
 ICU: Intensive Care Unit
 INC: Intensive Neonatal Care certification
 INS: Informatics Nurse Specialist
 IPN: Immunisation Program Nurse: Queensland Australia specialist qualification / endorsement
 IR: Interventional Radiology

L
 LCCE: Lamaze Certified Childbirth Educator
 LGN: Licensed Graduate Nurse(British Columbia, Canada)
 LGN(P): Licensed Graduate Nurse, Provisional</ref>(British Columbia, Canada)
 LNC: Legal Nurse Consultant
 LNCC: Legal Nurse Consultant, Certified
 LNP: Licensed Nurse Practitioner—Used by the Commonwealth of Virginia, Board of Nursing, as a license status
 LPN: Licensed Practical Nurse
 LPT: Licensed Psychiatric Technician 
 LSN: Licensed School Nurse
 LTAC: Long Term Acute Care
 LTC: Long Term Care (LPN Specific)
 LVN: Licensed Vocational Nurse

M
 MA: Master of Arts
 MACN: Member, Australian College of Nursing, Australia
 MAN: Master of Arts in Nursing
 MICT: Master of Information and Communication Technology
 MICU: Medical intensive care unit
 MICU: Mobile intensive care unit
 ME: Menopause Educator
 MEd: Master of Education
 MEmerg Nsg: Master's degree in Emergency Nursing Australia
 MENP: Master of Entry to Nursing Practice (for any non-nursing bachelor's degree)
 MHN: Mental Health Nurse—Registered Nurse Endorsed to practice Advanced nursing in Mental Health 
 MICN: Mobile Intensive Care Nurse
 MN: Master of Nursing
 MPH: Master of Public Health
 MRCN: Member, Royal College of Nursing (UK)
 MS: Master of Science
 MSA: Medicare Set-Aside
 MSN: Master of Science in Nursing
 MSN/Ed: Master of Science in Nursing Education
 MSN-NLM: Master of Science in Nursing, Nursing Leadership and Management.

N
 NC-BC: Nurse Coach-Board Certified (certified by AHNCC)
 NCMP: Certified Menopause Practitioner
 NCSN: National Certified School Nurse
 NE-BC: Nurse Executive-Board Certified
 NEA-BC: Nurse Executive Advanced-Board Certified
 NHDP-BC: National Healthcare Disaster Professional-Board Certified
 NICU: Neonatal Intensive Care Unit
 NNP-BC: Neonatal Nurse Practitioner
 NP(A): Nurse Practitioner, Adult(British Columbia, Canada)
 NP(F): Nurse Practitioner, Family(British Columbia, Canada)
 NP(P): Nurse Practitioner, Pediatrics(British Columbia, Canada)
 NP-C: Nurse Practitioner, Certified (certified by AANPBC)
 NPP: Nurse Practitioner, Psychiatric
 NSE: Nursing Student Extern
 NSWOC: Nurses Specialized in Wound, Ostomy and Continence
 NRP: Neonatal Resuscitation Program (not intended for postnominal use)
 NVRN: Neurovascular Registered Nurse
 NZCFN: New Zealand Certified Flight Nurse
 NPS: Neonatal / Pediatric Specialty

O
 OCN: Oncology Certified Nurse
 OMS: Ostomy Management Specialist
 ONC: Orthopaedic Nurse Certified

P
 PACU: Post-anesthesia care unit
 PALS: Pediatric Advanced Life Support (not intended for postnominal use)
 PCCN: Progressive Care Certified Nurse
 PCNS: Pediatric Clinical Nurse Specialist
 PhD: Doctor of Philosophy
 PHN: Public Health Nurse
PHNA-BC: Advanced Public Health Nurse
 PHRN: Pre-Hospital Registered Nurse
 PICU: Pediatric Intensive Care Unit
 PMH-BC: Psychiatric Mental Health Nurse
 PMHNP-BC: Psychiatric Mental Health Nurse Practitioner
 PMHCNS-BC: Psychiatric Mental Health Clinical Nurse Specialist
 PNP-BC: Pediatric Nurse Practitioner - Board Certified 
 PNP-AC: Pediatric Nurse Practitioner - Acute Care
 PNP-PC: Pediatric Nurse Practitioner - Primary Care

Q
 QN: Queen's Nurse

R
 RAC-CT: Resident Assessment Coordinator
 RCP: Respiratory Care Practitioner
 RDN: Registered Dental Nurse (United Kingdom)
 RIN: Rural and Isolated Practice Registered Nurses (RIPRN) (Queensland, Australia)
 RM: Registered Midwife
 RMN: Registered Mental Nurse (United Kingdom)
 RN: Registered Nurse
 RN-BC: Registered Nurse, ANCC Board Certified
 RN(C): Registered Nurse, Certified Practice(British Columbia, Canada)
 RN(P): Registered Nurse, Provisional(British Columbia, Canada)
 RN(T): Registered Nurse, Temporary(British Columbia, Canada)
 RNC: Registered Nurse, Certified: American Academy Certified Nurse
 RNC-LRN: Registered nurse certified in low-risk neonatal nursing
 RNC-MNN: Registered nurse certified in maternal newborn nursing
 RNC-NIC: Registered nurse certified in neonatal intensive care
 RNC-OB: Registered nurse certified in inpatient obstetrics
 RNCS: Registered Nurse Clinical Specialist
 RNCS: Registered Nurse Certified Specialist
 RNFA: Registered Nurse First Assistant
 RNM: Registered Nurse-Midwife
 RNLD: Registered Nurse Learning Disabilities 
 RPN: Registered practical nurse
 RPN: Registered Psychiatric Nurse (Western Canada)
 RRT: Registered Respiratory Therapist

S
 SANE: Sexual Assault Nurse Examiner
 SANE-A: Certified Sexual Assault Nurse Examiner-Adult/Adolescent
 SANE-P: Certified Sexual Assault Nurse Examiner-Pediatric
 SCN: Supervisory Clinical Nurse
 SCRN: Stroke Certified Registered Nurse
 SEN: State Enrolled Nurse
 SHN: Sexual and Reproductive Health endorsed RN—Queensland Australia
 SN: Student Nurse (RN preparation)
 SNSC: School Nurse Services Credential (California CTC)
 SPN: Student Nurse (LPN preparation)
 SRNA: Student Registered Nurse Anesthetist(CRNA preparation)
 SVN: Student Nurse (LVN preparation)

T
 TCAR: Trauma Care After Resuscitation course 
 TCRN: Trauma Certified Registered Nurse
 TNCC: Trauma Nursing Core Course (not intended for postnominal use)
 TNCC-I: Trauma Nursing Core Course Instructor (not intended for postnominal use)
 TNCC-P: Trauma Nursing Core Course Provider  (not intended for postnominal use)
 TNP: Telephone Nursing Practitioner
 TNS: Trauma Nurse Specialist

V
VA-BC:  Vascular Access Board Certified

W
 WCC: Wound Care Certified
 WHNP-BC: Women's Health Care Nurse Practitioner
 CWOCN: Certified Wound, Ostomy, and Continence Nurse
 WTA-C: Certified Wound Treatment Associate

References

External links

 
Professional titles and certifications